Cosmology (2008) is a textbook by American physicist Steven Weinberg. The textbook is intended for final-year physics undergraduates or first-year graduate students. The book is a successor to Weinberg's 1972 textbook Gravitation and Cosmology.

Summary

Chapters

1. The Expansion of the Universe
2. The Cosmic Microwave Radiation Background
3. The Early Universe
4. Inflation
5. General Theory of Cosmological Fluctuations

6. Evolution of Cosmological Fluctuations
7. Anisotropies in the Microwave Sky
8. The Growth of Structure
9. Gravitational Lensing
10. Fluctuations from Inflation

References

External links

2008 non-fiction books
American non-fiction books
Books by Steven Weinberg
Cosmology books
English-language books
Oxford University Press books
Physics textbooks